means "doing/receiving sword" and is one of the two roles in kata of budō and bujutsu, the other being uchidachi (打太刀).  In modern Kendo this is normally written .

This role which does a technique and is best described as an adolescent child (or disciple) whose goal is to eagerly acquire the skills presented by uchidachi's technique. Shidachi is led by uchidachi who provides a true attack; this allows shidachi to learn correct body displacement, combative distancing, proper spirit, and the perception of opportunity. Unfortunately, students often act as though they want to test their skills against those of the higher-ranked uchidachi. They consider this competition to be their practice. In fact, this leads to neither better technique, nor greater spiritual development, because the correct relationship between uchidachi and shidachi has been obscured. 

Especially during the parts of a kata with identical movements or intensely linked movements, shidachi will move like a shadow of uchidachi, neither being ahead of the movement, nor lagging behind.

References

Japanese martial arts terminology